Ptychadena obscura is a species of frog in the family Ptychadenidae.
It is found in Democratic Republic of the Congo, Zambia, possibly Angola, and possibly Tanzania.
Its natural habitats are moist savanna, subtropical or tropical seasonally wet or flooded lowland grassland, swamps, freshwater lakes, and intermittent freshwater marshes.

References

Ptychadena
Taxonomy articles created by Polbot
Amphibians described in 1959